Sreejita De (born 19 July 1989) is an Indian actress and model who works in Hindi television. She is best known for portraying Mukta Rathore in Colors TV's serial Uttaran which ranks among the longest-running show and Dilruba in Star Plus's supernatural thriller Nazar. She also appeared as a contestant in the reality TV show Bigg Boss 16.

Personal life 
Sreejita got engaged to her long-term boyfriend Michael Blohm-Pape on 21 December 2021.

Career
She made her debut on TV with Kasautii Zindagii Kay, playing the role of Gargi Tushar Bajaj. At the same time Ekta Kapoor offered her the role of Aastha in Karam Apna Apna. In 2008, she appeared in the Bollywood film Tashan as Paravati. In the same year, she played the lead role in the soap opera Annu Ki Ho Gayee Waah Bhai Waah as Annu. In 2012 she bagged the lead character of Mukta Raghuvendra Pratap Rathore, Tapasya's daughter, in Uttaran on Colors TV.

She played the lead role of Shreya Bhushan Pethewala in Tum Hi Ho Bandhu Sakha Tumhi, which is aired on Zee TV. In 2016 she joined the cast of Piya Rangrezz as Aradhya Shamsher Singh, which aired on Life Ok. She was seen in the Star Plus show Koi Laut Ke Aaya Hai as Kavya.

Apart from that, she has done episodic roles in shows like Savdhaan India, Aahat, Ssshhhh...Koi Hai, Aye Zindagi, Mahima Shani Dev Ki and Chakradhari Ajay Krishna.

From 2018 to 2020, she was seen in Nazar as Dilruba. In 2019, she join Yehh Jadu Hai Jinn Ka! Where she portrayed the role of Aliya.

From 2022 to 2023, she participated in Colors TV's popular reality show Bigg Boss 16. She was evicted on Day 13 but later returned as a wild-card on Day 69. On Day 105, she was evicted, finishing at 12th place.

Filmography

Films

Television

Web series

See also 
 List of Indian television actresses

References

External links

 

20th-century Bengalis
21st-century Bengalis
Living people
Actresses from Kolkata
Indian television actresses
Indian film actresses
Indian soap opera actresses
1989 births
Actresses in Hindi cinema
Actresses in Hindi television
21st-century Indian actresses